Cu mâinile curate (With Clean Hands) is a 1972 Romanian crime thriller film directed by and starring Sergiu Nicolaescu.

Plot
Set in post war Romania, Roman Mihai, a communist who was tortured by the fascists during the war, is now a police detective determined to rid his city of gangsters and black marketeers. Commissioner Roman is introduced as a rookie detective.

Cast
 Nita Anastase as Alexe
 Ion Apahideanu as policeman
 Sergiu Nicolaescu as Commissioner Tudor Miclovan
 Corina Chiriac as singer
 Ilarion Ciobanu as Mihai Roman
 George Constantin as Semaca
 Stelian Cremenciuc as Scorțea's man
 Gheorghe Dinică as Lăscărică
  as Ștefan Patulea
  as Puiu Scorțea
  as Bleoarcä
  as Mrs. Patulea
  as Burdujel
 Aimée Iacobescu as Charlotte
 Sebastian Papaiani as Fane Oarcă
 Ștefan Mihăilescu-Brăila as Buciurligă
  as Niculae Popa
  as Șchiopu
  as guard 
  as Semaca's man

References

External links
 

1972 films
1970s buddy cop films
1970s crime thriller films
Romanian crime thriller films
1970s Romanian-language films
Films set in Bucharest
Films set in 1945
Films directed by Sergiu Nicolaescu